Bogdan P. K. Perzyński is a contemporary artist who lives and works in Austin, Texas. Perzyński approaches his work as an organism rather than an object. His practice focuses on the interdisciplinary aspects of art. Drawing upon the philosophies of communicative action, social pragmatism, and individual invention, by necessity it embodies and embraces complexity. His recent work concentrates on computational fluid dynamics and contemporary data collection, retention and visualization, particularly as they pertain to the future's ecology. He has worked with installation art since 1978, and in 1990 began working with sound, video, sensors and body-based interactivity. For over 35 years, he has produced works that respond to architectural contexts. His work has been presented in Argentina, Brazil, China, Germany, Greece, Israel, the Netherlands, Poland, Thailand, New Zealand, and the United States.

Career
Perzyński's first solo show was at the Akumulatory 2, a non-profit art gallery.  From 1979 to 1983, he taught at Poznań's Państwowa Wyższa Szkoła Sztuk Plastycznych. While working in Akumulatory 2 gallery,  he co-organized exhibitions of numerous international artists who were driven by similar motivations.  Before leaving Poland, he participated in re-enactment of several renowned Fluxus performances (e.g. Fluxus Clinic and Fluxus Sports) and produced an interview with Emmett Williams, an artist, poet and Fluxus member. During this time, he also travelled frequently to West Berlin, and in 1983 moved to Hamburg. The following year he relocated to Santa Barbara, California, and began teaching at the University of California Santa Barbara. Since 1987 he has been on the faculty in the Department of Art & Art History at the University of Texas at Austin, where he co-founded the Transmedia area of studies. He maintains an American, and a Polish residence.

Style
Perzyński's early artworks investigated the discourses of public space and utilized photography, performance, interventions, and philosophy of language, culminating in a period during the late 1980s-early 1990s characterized by a series of intricate large-scale installations, shown widely, including at the Mattress Factory in Pittsburgh, PA.

From 2004 to 2010 Perzyński created the major full-length video work Fortune Teller. Commenting on the piece, Dr. Martin Patrick stated: “The video drew inspiration from the artist's own biographical experiences and how they seemed to uncannily intersect with horoscope entries from Vogue magazine. The resultant video collecting twelve short vignettes, incorporates a wide range of cultural reference points from new physics and technologies to Brion Gysin's Dream Machine.” Writer and art curator Angélica de Moraes writes of the artist's work: "Perzyński reflects on the random decisions that mark our life and the precariousness of what we call destiny."  Fortune Teller has been internationally presented, including at Ngā Taonga Sound & Vision in Wellington, New Zealand, Dallas Contemporary in Dallas, and Santander Cultural in Porto Alegre, Argentina.

Over the last eighteen years, Perzyński have continued his installation work, although redirecting his focus onto the vanishing distinctions between the local and the global. He has been further developing his installation TABLE, a photographic sequence prompted by periodic table, combining images of ecological, social, and political reference.

References

Further reading 
 Bożena Czubak and Jarosław Kozłowski, eds., Beyond Corrupted Eye. Akumulatory 2 Gallery, 1972–1990, Zachęta National Gallery of Art, Polish and English cat., Warsaw 2012: 48, 630
 Patrick, Martin, Bogdan Perzyński: Selected Photographic Documents and Video Works cat., 2011
 Moraes, Angélica de, Fragments of the Here and Now, in exhibition catalogue: "Agora/Ágora-Criação e Transgressão em Rede,” 2011: 144-145
 Virtual Migrations, Handwerkengasse, Völklingen, Saarbrücken, Germany, cat., 2008
 Kepińska, Alicja. Sztuka w Kulturze Płynności. Arsenal, 2004: 99-101
 The Overseas International Art Project. Ex. cat. Silpakorn University. Bangkok, 2003: 104-109
 Installations. Mattress Factory 1990-1999. Cat. Mattress Factory. Pittsburgh: University of Pittsburgh Press, 2001: 40
 Block, Diana. Revelation, Dallas Visual Art Center, Dallas
 Piwna 20/26, Emilii i Andrzeja Dłużniewskich, 1980–93. Warszawa: Muzeum Akademii Sztuk Pięknych, Warszawa
 Kepińska, Alicja. Energie Sztuki, Wiedza Powszechna. Warszawa, 1991: 75–76, 188, pl. 7 
 Hendricks, Patricia O., Reese, Becky Duval.  Cat. A Century of Sculpture in Texas 1889-1989
 Frank, Peter. Ilya Kabakov. Bogdan Perzyński, LA Weekly, Feb. 15. 1990: 125

External links 
 bogdanperzynski.com

Polish emigrants to the United States
Polish artists
Living people
American video artists
1954 births
Academic staff of the University of Fine Arts in Poznań
University of Texas at Austin faculty